Cumhscraidh mac Céacht, was according to medieval Irish legend and historical tradition, Irish King.

Cumhscraidh was a ten-time great-grandson of Lugaid mac Con. According to the genealogies, The Conmaicne of Cúl converge around Cumhscraidh. This would make him the ancestor of the Conmaícne Cúl Toland, who were located along the border of County Galway - County Mayo. Notables descended from him include Cruimthear Mac Carthaigh, Jarlath of Tuam and some of the abbots of Clonmacnoise.

References

 Irish Kings and High Kings, Francis John Byrne, 2001 (second edition).
 The Great Book of Irish Genealogies, 731.3, 731.5, pp. 718-19, volume two, Dubhaltach MacFhirbhisigh; edited, with translation and indices by Nollaig Ó Muraíle, 2003-2004. .

People from County Galway
Monarchs from County Mayo
Irish kings
People of Conmaicne Cuile Toladh